Jura Docenko Futbola Skola Alberts, commonly referred to as JDFS Alberts, is a Latvian football club based in Riga, that plays in Latvian First League (1. līga), the second-highest division of Latvian football.
The club was founded as a football school in 2008 on the basis of FK Alberts youth system. It was named after a football coach Juris Docenko who died in January 2008.
Before the 2015 season the club received a license to participate in the First League.

League and Cup history

Current squad
.

Team staff

References

External links
Official website 

Football clubs in Latvia
2008 establishments in Latvia